SS Vigrid was a Norwegian steam-powered cargo ship built in 1915. Sailing during the First World War, she was torpedoed and sunk without warning by a German U-boat on 31 December 1917.

Construction
A 1,617 gross register tons (951 net register tons) vessel, she was built by the shipyard Bergens Mekaniske Verksted in the Western Norwegian port city of Bergen. Having yard number 191, she was launched on 29 October 1915 and completed the next month. Vigrid was powered by a single triple-expansion 885 ihp steam turbine engine. After completion she was assigned the code letters MLRT.

First World War
Vigrid sailed during the First World War, with H.M. Jensen as her captain. She belonged to the company of ship-broker Anton Barth von der Lippe in the port city Tønsberg, until she was bought by ship-broker Johan Waage's company D/S A/S Vigrid of Bergen in August 1917.

Although Norway remained officially neutral throughout the First World War, her large fleet of merchant ships, over 2,000 strong, served a vital role in keeping the United Kingdom with supplies. The Norwegian merchant navy suffered heavy losses to German U-boats during the war, losing close to half its ships, with an official death toll of 1,892 sailors.

Sinking

On 31 December 1917 she was attacked and torpedoed without warning by the German U-boat , commanded by Kapitänleutnant Athalwin Prinz. U-95 belonged to the German 4th U-boat Flotilla. At the time of her sinking, she was en route from the port of Barry in Wales to Rouen in France with a cargo of 2,102 tons of coal. Five members of the crew were lost, while the captain and thirteen other crewmen survived the loss of the ship and landed at Penzance in Cornwall. Three of the sailors lost on Vigrid were Swedish citizens, the other two Norwegians.

Aftermath
On 16 January 1918, 16 days after sinking Vigrid, U-95 was lost with all 36 crew members to unknown causes near Hardelot in France. Before being lost, U-95 had managed to sink a total of 14 ships and damage another three vessels during the course of the six patrols she carried out in her career.

References

Notes

Citations

Bibliography

 
 

Ships built in Bergen
Steamships of Norway
World War I merchant ships of Norway
Ships sunk by German submarines in World War I
World War I shipwrecks in the English Channel
1915 ships
Maritime incidents in 1917